Hamka Hamzah (born 29 January 1984) is an Indonesian professional footballer who plays  as a centre-back for Liga 2 club Bekasi City. In the past, he once played as a forward. Hamka also has one appearance as a goalkeeper in Persik Kediri.

Honours

Club 

Persebaya Surabaya
 First Division: 2003

Persipura Jayapura
 Indonesia Super League: 2010–11

Sriwijaya
 East Kalimantan Governor Cup: 2018

Arema
 Indonesia President's Cup: 2019

RANS Cilegon
 Liga 2 runner-up: 2021

National team 
Indonesia U-21
 Hassanal Bolkiah Trophy: 2002
Indonesia
 AFF Championship runner-up: 2004, 2010

Individual
 Indonesia President's Cup Best Player: 2019
 Liga 1 Best XI: 2017
 Indonesia Soccer Championship A Best XI: 2016
 Indonesian Soccer Awards: Best 11 2019
 Indonesian Soccer Awards: Best Defender  2019
 Liga 2 Best XI: 2021

References

External links 
 
 

1984 births
Living people
Bugis people
People from Makassar
Sportspeople from South Sulawesi
Sportspeople from Makassar
Indonesian footballers
2004 AFC Asian Cup players
Arema F.C. players
PSM Makassar players
Persebaya Surabaya players
Persik Kediri players
Persija Jakarta players
Persisam Putra Samarinda players
Persipura Jayapura players
Mitra Kukar players
PKNS F.C. players
Borneo F.C. players
Sriwijaya F.C. players
Persita Tangerang players
RANS Nusantara F.C. players
Liga 1 (Indonesia) players
Liga 2 (Indonesia) players
Indonesian Premier Division players
Malaysia Super League players
Indonesia international footballers
Indonesian expatriate sportspeople in Malaysia
Indonesian expatriate footballers
Expatriate footballers in Malaysia
Association football defenders
Indonesia under-21 international footballers